Trenton Carl Barnhart (born November 12, 1996) is an  American politician who has served as a Delegate from the 7th district to the West Virginia House of Delegates since 2019. Barnhart is a Republican.

Early life, education, and career
Barnhart was born in St. Marys, West Virginia to Mark and Lori Barnhart. He has a B.A. and an M.B.A from the University of Charleston. He was employed as a community banker and compliance auditor. He was also a member of the Pleasants County Republican Executive Committee.

Elections

2019
Barnhart was appointed by West Virginia governor Jim Justice following the resignation of Delegate Jason Harshbarger, on September 17, 2019.

2020
In his first primary election, Barnhart was challenged by fellow Republican Kerry Murphy, whom he defeated with 53.65% of the vote.

Barnhart won unopposed in the general election.

Tenure

Committee assignments
Workforce Development (Vice Chair)
Banking and Insurance
Government Organization
Health and Human Resources
Small Business and Economic Development

Barnhart is an Assistant Majority Whip in the Republican-controlled House of Delegates.

Barnhart had a 14% rating from the West Virginia chapter of the Sierra Club as of 2020.

Gun rights
Barnhart is a member of the NRA. He has an A rating from the West Virginia Citizens Defense League, a gun rights organization, of which he is member, as of 2020. Barnhart was a sponsor of HB 2739, a bill that would declare West Virginia a Second Amendment "sanctuary state."

DC statehood
With many of his fellow Delegates, Barnhart signed onto a resolution requesting West Virginia Senators and Congressmen to oppose bills that would allow statehood for the District of Columbia.

Personal life
Barnhart is a Christian.

References

Republican Party members of the West Virginia House of Delegates
Living people
1996 births
21st-century American politicians
People from St. Marys, West Virginia
University of Charleston alumni
Christians from West Virginia